Hugh MacDonald (correctly Macdonald) is a film director from New Zealand. He has worked on films for the Government National Film Unit including travel films and historical drama The Governor. He has been nominated for an Academy Award for Animated Short Film as producer.

Work
Macdonald directed the short film This is New Zealand which was shown across three screens in the New Zealand pavilion at Expo '70 in Osaka. 

In 1986, he was nominated for an Academy Award for Animated Short Film as producer of The Frog, the Dog and the Devil, made with the  New Zealand National Film Unit and Martin Townsend.

In August 2017, Macdonald presented at the NZIFF the biographical documentary "No Ordinary Sheila", which describes the 9-decades-long life of the Wellington-based natural historian, illustrator and writer Sheila Natusch. The movie was filmed over three years (2014-2017), mostly shot in Wellington and Stewart Island.

References

External links 
 
 Hugh Macdonald at NZ On Screen
 

New Zealand film directors
Living people
Year of birth missing (living people)